Big Heat is a Cantopop album by Leslie Cheung first released in July 2000. This album was released before Leslie Cheung's Passion Tour concert.

The song 'Fever' won China's Original Music Award (2001).  The song 'I' is said to be a song of the self-statement of Leslie Cheung.

Track listing
 I [Summer Passion Concert Finale]- 3:42
 Greatest Heat - 3:40
 Love for Houston - 4:13
 Someone Beside Me - 4:05
 Miracle - 4:49
 Don't Lie to Me - 4:22
 Afternoon Tea - 5:10
 Without Love (theme song of movie Okinawa Rendez-vous) - 4:11
 It's up to You - 3:59
 There Is Always Sparkles (theme song of Hong Kong No Smoking Act) - 3:52
 Fever (Mandarin) - 3:40
 I (Mandarin) - 3:41

Leslie Cheung albums
2000 albums